Pragmatism is a philosophical movement.

Pragmatism or pragmatic may also refer to:
Pragmaticism, Charles Sanders Peirce's post-1905 branch of philosophy
Pragmatics, a subfield of linguistics and semiotics
Pragmatics, an academic journal in the field of pragmatics
Pragmatic ethics, a theory of normative philosophical ethics
Realpolitik, politics or diplomacy based primarily on practical considerations rather than ideological notions, simply referred to as "pragmatism" in politics

See also
Centrism, a political outlook opposing significant shift to the left or the right